Rogóż may refer to the following places in Poland:
 Rogóż, Lidzbark County
 Rogóż, Nidzica County